Pure autonomic failure (PAF) is a form of dysautonomia that first occurs in middle age or later in life; diagnosed more often in men than in women.

Signs and symptoms
A degenerative disease of the autonomic nervous system, symptoms include dizziness and fainting (caused by orthostatic hypotension), visual disturbances and neck pain. Chest pain, fatigue and sexual dysfunction are less common symptoms that may also occur. Symptoms are worse when standing; sometimes one may relieve symptoms by lying down.

More pervasive autonomic dysfunction involving any of the following: night sweats or abnormal lack of sweating, urogenital problems (frequent UTIs, incontinence, frequency, urgency), gastrointestinal problems (chronic constipation, chronic constipation alternating with diarrhea, poor gastric motility), or esophageal/respiratory problems (sleep apnea, abnormal breath sounds during sleep or while awake) indicate possible autoimmune autonomic ganglionopathy or multiple system atrophy.

Pathology
The pathology of pure autonomic failure is not yet completely understood. However, a loss of cells in the intermediolateral column of the spinal cord has been documented, as has a loss of catecholamine uptake and catecholamine fluorescence in sympathetic postganglionic neurons. In general, levels of catecholamines in these patients are very low while lying down, and do not increase much upon standing.

Treatment
Pharmacological methods of treatment include fludrocortisone, midodrine, somatostatin, erythropoietin, and other vasopressor agents. However, often a patient with pure autonomic failure can mitigate his or her symptoms with far less costly means. Compressing the legs and lower body, through crossing the legs, squatting, or the use of compression stockings can help. Use of an abdominal binder is even more effective. Also, ingesting more water than usual can increase blood pressure and relieve some symptoms.

History
In 1925, Bradbury and Eggleston first characterized three patients seemingly with a common syndrome, with what they described as "the occurrence of syncopal attacks after or during exertion or even after standing erect for some minutes. Other features in the three patients are a slow, unchanging pulse rate, incapacity to perspire, a lowered basal metabolism and signs of slight and indefinite changes in the nervous system. Each of these patients felt much worse during the heat of summer." Further research identified multiple causes for these syndromic findings, now grouped as primary autonomic disorders (also called primary dysautonomia), including Pure Autonomic Failure, Multiple System Atrophy, and Parkinson's. The primary differentiating characteristic of Pure autonomic failure is decreased circulation and synthesis of norepinephrine, and dysfunction localized peripherally. It is relevant to note that progression to central nervous system neurodegeneration can also occur.

Eponym
It is also known as Bradbury-Eggleston syndrome, named after Samuel Bradbury and Cary Eggleston who first described it in 1925.

References

Peripheral nervous system disorders